Isaac Morley Whiting (October 1, 1842 – May 28, 1922) was a Latter Day Saint leader who served as the third president of The Church of Jesus Christ (Cutlerite), from 1902 to 1922. During Whiting's tenure, the Cutlerites successfully established an Order of Enoch, as advocated by founding prophet Joseph Smith during the early years of his movement. This Order, which emphasizes communal ownership of property, still functions in the church today.

Early years
Whiting was born on 1 October 1842 in Lima, Illinois, to Chancey Whiting, who was also his predecessor in office in the Cutlerite church. When he was still very young, his family relocated first to Winter Quarters, Nebraska, and later to Manti, Iowa, where his parents joined Mormon leader Alpheus Cutler in forming the Church of Jesus Christ, commonly known as "Cutlerites." He married Sarah Jane Talcott on 24 December 1863, in Manti.

Trained as a wagon-maker, Whiting moved with his family to Clitherall, Minnesota, where he served as First Counselor to his father while he was leader of the Cutlerite community.

Presidency
Whiting succeeded to the presidency of the Cutlerite church in 1902. In 1910, he attempted to re-establish the United Order; previous attempts by the Cutlerites to do this in Manti had failed. By 1912 these endeavors had borne fruit, and a church corporation had taken charge of Cutlerite properties in Clitherall. He continued to serve in his office until his death on 28 May 1922. Whiting also supervised the construction of a new meetinghouse in Clitherall which still stands today, though it is no longer in use.

Family
Whiting and his wife had nine children:

Charles Llewelyn
Emily Augusta
Addie Belle
Nelson Francis "Frank"
Rosille
Ivan Erle
Julian Everson
Roy Rockwood
Daisy Evangeline

References

1842 births
1922 deaths
American Latter Day Saint leaders
Leaders in the Church of Jesus Christ (Cutlerite)
People from Adams County, Illinois
People from Shenandoah, Iowa
People from Otter Tail County, Minnesota